The S5W reactor is a nuclear reactor used by the United States Navy to provide electricity generation and propulsion on warships.  The S5W designation stands for:

 S = Submarine platform
 5 = Fifth generation core designed by the contractor
 W = Westinghouse was the contracted designer

History 
The S5W was the standard reactor for submarines of the United States Navy from its first use in 1959 on  until the introduction of the s with S6G reactor in the mid-1970s. One S5W plant was also used in the United Kingdom on the Royal Navy's first nuclear-powered submarine .

Some time before 1971, the S5W vessel and core replaced the S1W reactor vessel and core at the S1W prototype facility. Even though operating an S5W reactor core, the facility continued to be called S1W. To use the additional power generated by the S5W reactor at higher power levels, steam dumps were constructed in the same S1W building but outside the original submarine style hull.

, one S5W reactor plant remains in service: the ex-USS Daniel Webster (MTS-626). This "moored training ship" is used to train U.S. naval nuclear operators at the former Naval Weapons Station Charleston. This training ship is equipped with a diesel-powered Supplemental Water Injection System (SWIS) to provide emergency cooling water in the event of an accident.

Design 
This pressurized water reactor's simplicity, overdesign, and redundancy was intended for ease of operation and tolerance of battle damage.  These characteristics contributed greatly to the type's reliability, longevity, and excellent safety record. 

Later-model S5W reactor plants were often refueled with a S3G core-3, the third version of the S3G core.

Although the US Navy classifies its nuclear technology, there are periodic reports and disclosures which explain the subject in layman's terms.  In the 2007 book "Scorpion Down" (pages 143 to 152), author Ed Offley narrates the startup commands and general functions of the S5W reactor on USS Scorpion.  This and other passages illustrate the complexity of the propulsion system and the risks of nuclear submarines.

References

External links
 S5W at the Federation of American Scientists

 

United States naval reactors